Saif bin Zayed Al Nahyan (born 1968) is United Arab Emirates's minister of interior since October 2004 and deputy prime minister since May 2009. As Minister of Interior, he is in charge of the United Arab Emirates interior protection and homeland security. He is a member of the Al Nahyan family.

Early life and education
Nahyan was born in 1968. He is one of Zayed bin Sultan's many sons. His mother is Mouza bint Suhail Al Khaili. Sheikh Saif attended the United Arab Emirates University in Al Ain and graduated with a bachelor's degree in political science.

He participated in several training sessions, including the special training session for paratroopers in 1991.

Personal Life
Sheikh Saif is married to Sheikha bint Hamad Al Khalili, a daughter of Major-General Hamad bin Suhail Al Khalili. They have five children.

Career
Prior to his ministerial appointment in October 2004, Sheikh Saif occupied several leadership positions. He was the deputy director of the capital police from 1994 to 1995 before becoming the director general of the Abu Dhabi Police on 23 October 1995. On 25 December 1997, he became the Undersecretary of the Ministry of Interior, retaining this post until his appointment as Minister of Interior on 2 November 2004.

On 30 December 2004, he was promoted to the rank of Lieutenant General. In addition, he was appointed Minister of Interior to the government led by Sheikh Mohammed bin Rashid Al Maktoum on the same day. He was named as the Deputy Prime Minister on 11 May 2009, retaining his post as Minister of Interior.

Activities
His achievement in the realms of police and security includes launching the community police project in 2003, founding the Ministry of Interior's centers for rehabilitating persons with special needs in 2002 and the social support center in 2004. He also directed the five-year plan for the strategic development of the Abu Dhabi Police (2004–2008), the five-year plan for the Ministry of Interior and oversaw the restructuring of the Abu Dhabi Police. Moreover, he sought a permanent solution to the problem of child jockeys in camel races and initiated a number of practical security measures to counter this problem. He also launched the "iris scan" project – which succeeded in preventing more than 114,000 persons from returning to the UAE since the project was implemented nationwide – and launched the project of the Emirates Identity Authority.

Recognition
Sheikh Saif has received several medals and honors, including the Order of Merit for Dedicated Service in 2000, the Red Crescent Charitable medal, and the Order of Merit of the International Civil Defense Organization, ICDO (Commander Rank).

On 15 February 2010, he was awarded an honorary degree of doctor in the social sciences from the University of Wolverhampton.

Ancestry

References

External links

1968 births
Living people
Saif bin Zayed Al
Children of presidents of the United Arab Emirates
United Arab Emirates University alumni
Interior ministers of the United Arab Emirates
Deputy Prime Ministers of the United Arab Emirates
Sons of monarchs